Claudia Wu is the former creative director of Cherry Bombe, a twice-yearly magazine about women and food.

Early life 
Wu grew up in Briarcliff Manor, New York with Taiwanese immigrant parents.

She has a degree from the Rhode Island School of Design.

Career 
Wu began her career for the magazines Visionaire and V, then worked at Harper's Bazaar where she met her future Cherry Bombe partner, Kerry Diamond. Wu founded her own design firm called Orphan where she worked with Hugo Boss, NARS, Clinique and Intermix, among others. She founded Me magazine, a publication dedicated to and guest-edited by a different star for every issue.

In 2013, Wu and Kerry Diamond founded the food-fashion magazine Cherry Bombe, which was funded by Diamond  and through Kickstarter. In 2014, they started the Cherry Bombe Jubilee conference which celebrates women in the culinary world.

References

Living people
American people of Taiwanese descent
People from Briarcliff Manor, New York
Rhode Island School of Design alumni
Year of birth missing (living people)